Anna Exl (born Anna Gstöttner; 2 September 1882 – 15 November 1969) was an Austrian stage and film actress. She was married to the actor Ferdinand Exl, with whom she had a daughter Ilse. Her younger sister Mimi Gstöttner-Auer was also an actress.

Selected filmography
 The Vulture Wally (1940)
 Earth (1947)
 Ulli and Marei (1948)
 Veronika the Maid (1951)

References

Bibliography
 Fritsche, Maria. Homemade Men in Postwar Austrian Cinema: Nationhood, Genre and Masculinity. Berghahn Books, 2013.

External links

1882 births
1969 deaths
Actors from Innsbruck
People from the County of Tyrol
Austrian film actresses
Austrian silent film actresses
Austrian stage actresses
20th-century Austrian actresses